EYF may refer to:
 Curtis L. Brown Jr. Field, in Bladen County, North Carolina, United States
 European Youth Forum